The Bolte Ministry was a Ministry of the Government of Victoria, and was led by Liberal Premier Henry Bolte. It succeeded the Cain ministry on 7 June 1955, following the defeat of the Labor government at the 1955 election held ten days earlier. The ministry lasted over 17 years and was followed by the Hamer Ministry on 24 August 1972 after the resignation of Bolte from politics.

First Ministry
On 7 and 8 June 1955, the Governor, Sir Dallas Brooks, appointed the following ministers to the portfolios indicated. Some changes resulted from the departure of William Leggatt, who was appointed Agent-General for Victoria in London in February 1956, the death of Robert Whately the following month, and the appointment of Gordon McArthur as President of the Victorian Legislative Council. However, the ministry was stable from 1956 until its reconstitution after the 1961 election.

The list below is ordered by decreasing seniority within the Cabinet, as indicated by the Government Gazette and the Victorian Year Book.

Second Ministry
On 28 July 1961, following the 1961 election, the Bolte Ministry was reconstituted. Sir Ewen Cameron became Chairman of Committees in the Legislative Council, whilst Sir Thomas Maltby retired from politics. They were replaced by Ronald Mack and Edward Meagher. The ministry was reconstituted on 8 July 1964 following the 1964 election.

Third Ministry
On 8 July 1964, following the 1964 election, the Bolte Ministry was reconstituted.

References

Victoria (Australia) ministries
Liberal Party of Australia ministries in Victoria (Australia)
Ministries of Elizabeth II